Pleasant Valley School District may refer to:
Pleasant Valley School District (California)
Pleasant Valley School District (Idaho)
Pleasant Valley School District (Pennsylvania)